Esplanada is a neighborhood (bairro) of Belo Horizonte. The population of the neighborhood is estimated at 8,800 residents. The neighborhood still retains characteristics of inner cities even if it is located near the central region of the state capital.

References

Neighbourhoods in Belo Horizonte